keping may refer to:

Kelantan keping, a former currency of Kelantan (now part of Malaysia)
Trengganu keping, a former currency of Trengganu (now part of Malaysia)
Keping County, county in Xinjiang, China